James "Jim" Pleasants is an American curler and curling coach from Seattle, Washington.

As of 2012-2014 he was a President of United States Curling Association.

Curling career
In 1989 Fish played third on Jim Vukich's team, they won US Men's Championship and placing tenth at World's. In 1999 team with him and his wife Jaynie Pleasants won US Mixed championship.

Teams

Men's

Mixed

Mixed doubles

Record as a coach of national teams

References

External links 

 James Pleasants - Granite Curling Club

American male curlers
American curling champions
Sportspeople from Seattle
American curling coaches
Year of birth missing (living people)
Place of birth missing (living people)
Living people